Newark is the most populous city in the U.S. state of New Jersey and the seat of Essex County and one of the largest municipalities within the New York metropolitan area. As of the 2020 United States census, the city's population was 311,549, an increase of 34,409 (+12.4%) from the 2010 census count of 277,140, which in turn reflected an increase of 3,594 (+1.3%) from the 273,546 counted at the 2000 census. The Population Estimates Program calculated a population of 307,220 for 2021, making it the nation's 66th-most populous municipality.

Settled in 1666 by Puritans from New Haven Colony, Newark is one of the oldest cities in the United States. Its location at the mouth of the Passaic River (where it flows into Newark Bay) has made the city's waterfront an integral part of the Port of New York and New Jersey. Today, Port Newark–Elizabeth is the primary container shipping terminal of the busiest seaport on the U.S. East Coast. Newark Liberty International Airport was the first municipal commercial airport in the United States, and today is one of its busiest.

Several companies have their headquarters in Newark, including Prudential, PSEG, Panasonic Corporation of North America, Audible.com, IDT Corporation, Manischewitz and AeroFarms.

A number of higher education institutions are also in the city, including the Newark campus of Rutgers University (which includes law and medical schools and the Rutgers Institute of Jazz Studies); University Hospital (formerly the University of Medicine and Dentistry of New Jersey which included the schools of medicine and dentistry now under Rutgers University); the New Jersey Institute of Technology; and Seton Hall University's law school. The United States District Court for the District of New Jersey is also located in the city.

Local cultural venues include the New Jersey Performing Arts Center, Newark Symphony Hall, the Prudential Center, The Newark Museum of Art, and the New Jersey Historical Society.

Newark is divided into five political wards (East, West, South, North and Central) and contains neighborhoods ranging in character from bustling urban districts to quiet suburban enclaves. Newark's Branch Brook Park is the oldest county park in the United States and is home to the nation's largest collection of cherry blossom trees, numbering over 5,000.

History 

Newark was settled in 1666 by Connecticut Puritans led by Robert Treat from the New Haven Colony. It was conceived as a theocratic assembly of the faithful, though this did not last for long as new settlers came with different ideas. On October 31, 1693, it was organized as a New Jersey township based on the Newark Tract, which was first purchased on July 11, 1667. Newark was granted a royal charter on April 27, 1713. It was incorporated on February 21, 1798, by the New Jersey Legislature's Township Act of 1798, as one of New Jersey's initial group of 104 townships. During its time as a township, portions were taken to form Springfield Township (April 14, 1794), Caldwell Township (February 16, 1798; now known as Fairfield Township), Orange Township (November 27, 1806), Bloomfield Township (March 23, 1812) and Clinton Township (April 14, 1834, remainder reabsorbed by Newark on March 5, 1902). Newark was reincorporated as a city on April 11, 1836, replacing Newark Township, based on the results of a referendum passed on March 18, 1836. The previously independent Vailsburg borough was annexed by Newark on January 1, 1905. In 1926, South Orange Township changed its name to Maplewood. As a result of this, a portion of Maplewood known as Ivy Hill was re-annexed to Newark's Vailsburg.

The name of the city is thought to derive from Newark-on-Trent, England, because of the influence of the original pastor, Abraham Pierson, who came from Yorkshire but may have ministered in Newark, Nottinghamshire. But Pierson is also supposed to have said that the community reflecting the new task at hand should be named "New Ark" for "New Ark of the Covenant" and some of the colonists saw it as "New-Work", the settlers' new work with God. Whatever the origins, the name was shortened to Newark, although references to the name "New Ark" are found in preserved letters written by historical figures such as David Ogden in his claim for compensation, and James McHenry, as late as 1787.

During the American Revolutionary War, British troops made several raids into the town. The city saw tremendous industrial and population growth during the 19th century and early 20th century, and experienced racial tension and urban decline in the second half of the 20th century, culminating in the 1967 Newark riots.

The city has experienced revitalization since the 1990s.

Geography 

It has the third-smallest land area among the 100 most populous cities in the U.S., behind neighboring Jersey City and Hialeah, Florida. Newark is essentially a large basin sloping towards the Passaic River, with a few valleys formed by meandering streams. Historically, Newark's high places have been its wealthier neighborhoods. In the 19th century and early 20th century, the wealthy congregated on the ridges of Forest Hill, High Street, and Weequahic.

Until the 20th century, the marshes on Newark Bay were difficult to develop, as the marshes were essentially wilderness, with a few dumps, warehouses, and cemeteries on their edges. During the 20th century, the Port Authority of New York and New Jersey was able to reclaim  of the marshland for the further expansion of Newark Liberty International Airport, as well as the growth of the port lands.

Newark is surrounded by residential suburbs to the west (on the slope of the Watchung Mountains), the Passaic River and Newark Bay to the east, dense urban areas to the south and southwest, and middle-class residential suburbs and industrial areas to the north. The city is the largest in New Jersey's Gateway Region, which is said to have received its name from Newark's nickname as the "Gateway City".

The city borders the municipalities of Belleville, Bloomfield, East Orange, Irvington, Maplewood and South Orange in Essex County; Bayonne, East Newark, Harrison, Jersey City and Kearny in Hudson County; and Elizabeth and Hillside in Union County.

Neighborhoods 

Newark is the second-most racially diverse municipality in the state, behind neighboring Jersey City. It is divided into five political wards, which are often used by residents to identify their place of habitation. In recent years, residents have begun to identify with specific neighborhood names instead of the larger ward appellations. Nevertheless, the wards remain relatively distinct. Industrial uses, coupled with the airport and seaport lands, are concentrated in the East and South wards, while residential neighborhoods exist primarily in the North, Central, and West Wards.

State law requires that wards be compact and contiguous and that the largest ward may not exceed the population of the smallest by more than 10% of the average ward size. Ward boundaries are redrawn, as needed, by a board of ward commissioners consisting of two Democrats and two Republicans appointed at the county level and the municipal clerk. Redrawing of ward lines in previous decades have shifted traditional boundaries, so that downtown currently occupies portions of the East and Central wards. The boundaries of the wards are altered for various political and demographic reasons and sometimes gerrymandered.

Newark's Central Ward, formerly known as the old Third Ward, contains much of the city's history including the original squares Lincoln Park, Military Park and Harriet Tubman Square. The ward contains the University Heights, The Coast, historic Grace Episcopal Church, Government Center, Springfield/Belmont and Seventh Avenue neighborhoods. Of these neighborhood designations only University Heights, a more recent designation for the area that was the subject of the 1968 novel Howard Street by Nathan Heard, is still in common usage. The Central Ward extends at one point as far north as 2nd Avenue.

In the 19th century, the Central Ward was inhabited by Germans and other white Catholic and Protestant groups. The German inhabitants were later replaced by Jews, who were then replaced by African Americans. The increased academic footprint in the University Heights neighborhood has produced gentrification, with landmark buildings undergoing renovation. Located in the Central Ward is the nation's largest health sciences university, UMDNJ-New Jersey Medical School. It is also home to three other universities – New Jersey Institute of Technology (NJIT), Rutgers University – Newark, and Essex County College. The Central Ward forms the present-day heart of Newark, and includes 26 public schools, two police precincts, including headquarters, four firehouses, and one branch library.

The North Ward is surrounded by Branch Brook Park. Its neighborhoods include Broadway, Mount Pleasant, Upper Roseville and the affluent Forest Hill section. Forest Hill contains the Forest Hill Historic District, which is registered on state and national historic registers, and contains many older mansions and colonial homes. A row of residential towers with security guards and secure parking line Mt. Prospect Avenue in the Forest Hill neighborhood. The North Ward has lost geographic area in recent times; its southern boundary is now significantly further north than the traditional boundary near Interstate 280. The North Ward had its own Little Italy, centered on heavily Italian Seventh Avenue and the area of St. Lucy's Church; demographics have transitioned to Latino in recent decades, though the ward as a whole remains ethnically diverse.

The West Ward comprises the neighborhoods of Vailsburg, Ivy Hill, West Side, Fairmount and Lower Roseville. It is home to the historic Fairmount Cemetery. The West Ward, once a predominantly Irish-American, Polish, and Ukrainian neighborhood, is now home to neighborhoods composed primarily of Latinos, African Americans, and Caribbean Americans. The West Ward has struggled in recent years with elevated rates of crime, particularly violent crime.

The South Ward comprises the Weequahic, Clinton Hill, Dayton, and South Broad Valley neighborhoods. The South Ward, once home to residents of predominantly Jewish descent, now has ethnic neighborhoods made up primarily of African Americans and Hispanics. The city's second-largest hospital, Newark Beth Israel Medical Center, can be found in the South Ward, as can seventeen public schools, five daycare centers, three branch libraries, one police precinct, a mini-precinct, and three fire houses.

The East Ward consists of much of Newark's Downtown commercial district, as well as the Ironbound neighborhood, where much of Newark's industry was in the 19th century. Today, the Ironbound (also known as "Down Neck" and "The Neck") is a destination for shopping, dining, and nightlife. A historically immigrant-dominated section of the city, the Ironbound in recent decades has been termed "Little Portugal" and "Little Brazil" due to its heavily Portuguese and Brazilian population, Newark being home to one of the largest Portuguese speaking communities in the United States. In addition, the East Ward has become home to various Latin Americans, especially Ecuadorians, Peruvians, and Colombians, alongside Puerto Ricans, African Americans, and commuters to Manhattan. Public education in the East Ward consists of East Side High School and six elementary schools. The ward is largely composed of densely packed but well maintained housing and streets, primarily large apartment buildings and rowhouses.

Climate 
Newark lies in the transition between a humid subtropical and humid continental climate (Köppen Cfa/Dfa), with cold winters and hot humid summers. Spring and autumn in the area are generally unstable yet mild. Precipitation is evenly distributed throughout the year with the summer months being the wettest and fall months being the driest.

The January freezing isotherm that separates Newark into Dfa and Cfa zones approximates the NJ Turnpike.

Demographics 

Newark had a population of 311,549 in 2020, making it the 66th-most populous municipality in the United States, after being ranked 67th in 2010 and 63rd in 2000.

From 2000 to 2010, the increase of 3,594 inhabitants (+1.3%) from the 273,546 counted in the 2000 U.S. census marked the second census in 70 years in which the city's population had grown from the previous enumeration. This trend continued in 2020, where Newark had an increase of 34,409 (12.4%) from the 277,140 counted in the 2010 census, the largest percent increase in 100 years.

After reaching a peak of 442,337 residents counted in the 1930 census, and a post-war population of 438,776 in 1950, the city's population saw a decline of nearly 40% as residents moved to surrounding suburbs. White flight from Newark to the suburbs started in the 1940s and accelerated in the 1960s, due in part to the construction of the Interstate Highway System. The 1967 riots resulted in a significant population loss of the city's middle class, many of them Jewish, which continued from the 1970s through to the 1990s. On net, the city lost about 130,000 residents between 1960 and 1990.

At the 2010 census, there were 91,414 households, and 62,239 families in Newark. There were 108,907 housing units at an average density of 4,552.5 per square mile (1,757/km2). In 2000, there were 273,546 people, 91,382 households, and 61,956 families residing in the city. The population density was 11,495.0 per square mile (4,437.7/km2). There were 100,141 housing units at an average density of 4,208.1 per square mile (1,624.6//km²).

The U.S. Census Bureau's 2006–2010 American Community Survey showed that (in 2010 inflation-adjusted dollars) median household income was $35,659 (with a margin of error of +/- $1,009) and the median family income was $41,684 (+/- $1,116). Males had a median income of $34,350 (+/- $1,015) versus $32,865 (+/- $973) for females. The per capita income for the township was $17,367 (+/- $364). About 22% of families and 25% of the population were below the poverty line, including 34.9% of those under age 18 and 22.4% of those age 65 or over.

The median income for a household in 2000 was $26,913, and the median income for a family was $30,781. Males had a median income of $29,748 versus $25,734 for females. The per capita income for the city was $13,009. 28.4% of the population and 25.5% of families were below the poverty line. 36.6% of those under the age of 18 and 24.1% of those 65 and older were living below the poverty line. The city's unemployment rate was 8.5%.

Race and ethnicity 

From the 1950s to 1967, Newark's non-Hispanic white population shrank from 363,000 to 158,000; its black population grew from 70,000 to 220,000. The percentage of non-Hispanic whites declined from 82.8% in 1950 to 11.6% by 2010. The percentage of Latinos and Hispanics in Newark grew between 1980 and 2010, from 18.6% to 33.8% while that of Blacks and African Americans decreased from 58.2% to 52.4%.

At the American Community Survey's 2018 estimates, non-Hispanic whites made up 8.9% of the population. Black or African Americans were 47.0% of the population, Asian Americans were 2.1%, some other race 1.6%, and multiracial Americans 1.1%. Hispanics or Latinos of any race made up 39.2% of the city's population in 2018.

In 2010, 35.74% of the population was white, 58.86% African American, 3.99% Native American or Alaska Native, 2.19% Asian, .01% Pacific Islander, 10.4% from other races, and 10.95% from two or more races. Hispanics or Latinos of any race made up 33.39% of the population at the 2010 U.S. census.

The racial makeup of the city in 2000 was 53.46% (146,250) black or African American, 26.52% (72,537) white, 1.19% (3,263) Asian, 0.37% (1,005) Native American, 0.05% (135) Pacific Islander, 14.05% (38,430) from other races, and 4.36% (11,926) from two or more races. 29.47% (80,622) of the population were Hispanic or Latino of any race. 49.2% of the city's 80,622 residents who identified themselves as Hispanic or Latino were from Puerto Rico, while 9.4% were from Ecuador and 7.8% from the Dominican Republic. There is a significant Portuguese-speaking community concentrated in the Ironbound district. 2000 census data showed that Newark had 15,801 residents of Portuguese ancestry (5.8% of the population), while an additional 5,805 (2.1% of the total) were of Brazilian ancestry.

In advance of the 2000 census, city officials made a push to encourage residents to respond and participate in the enumeration, citing calculations by city officials that as many as 30,000 people were not reflected in estimates by the Census Bureau, which resulted in the loss of government aid and political representation. It is believed that heavily immigrant areas of Newark were significantly undercounted in the 2010 census, especially in the East Ward. Many households refused to participate in the census, with immigrants often reluctant to submit census forms because they believed that the information could be used to justify their deportation.

Religion 

Roughly 60% of Newarkers identified with a religion as of 2020. The largest Christian group in Newark is the Catholic Church (34.3%), followed by Baptists (5.2%). The city's Catholic population are divided into Latin and Eastern Catholics. The Latin Church-based Archdiocese of Newark, serving Bergen, Essex, Hudson and Union counties, is headquartered in the city. Its episcopal see is the Cathedral Basilica of the Sacred Heart. Eastern Catholics in the area are served by the Syriac Catholic Eparchy of Our Lady of Deliverance of Newark, an eparchy of the Syriac Catholic Church, and by the Ukrainian Catholic Archeparchy of Philadelphia, Pennsylvania. Baptist churches in Newark are affiliated with the American Baptist Churches USA, Progressive National Baptist Convention, the National Baptist Convention of America, and National Baptist Convention, USA, Inc.

Following, 2.4% identified with Methodism and the United Methodist Church and African Methodist Episcopal and AME Zion churches. 1.6% of Christian Newarkers are Presbyterian and 1.3% identified as Pentecostal. The Presbyterian community is dominated by the Presbyterian Church (USA) and Presbyterian Church in America. The Pentecostal community is dominated by the Church of God in Christ and Assemblies of God USA.

0.9% of Christians in the city and nearby suburbs identify as Anglican or Episcopalian. Most are served by the Newark Diocese of the Episcopal Church in the United States. The remainder identified with Continuing Anglican or Evangelical Episcopal bodies including the Reformed Episcopal Church and Anglican Church in North America. ACNA and REC-affiliated churches form the Diocese of the Northeast and Mid-Atlantic.

0.6% of Christians are members of the Latter Day Saint movement, followed by Lutherans (0.2%). 3.0% of the city's Christian populace were of other Christian denominations including the Eastern and Oriental Orthodox churches, Independent sacramental churches, the Jehovah's Witnesses, non-denominational Protestants, and the United Church of Christ. The largest Eastern Orthodox jurisdictions in Newark include the Greek Orthodox Archdiocese of America (Ecumenical Patriarchate) and the Diocese of New York and New Jersey (Orthodox Church in America). The largest Oriental Orthodox bodies include the Coptic Orthodox Church of Alexandria and Ethiopian Orthodox Tewahedo Church.

Judaism and Islam were tied as the second-largest religious community (3.0%). Up to 1967, Jewish Americans formed a substantial portion of the middle class. As of 2020, Orthodox, Conservative, and Reform Judaism were the most prevalent denominations affiliated with in Newark and suburban communities. Sunni, Shia, and Ahmadiyya Muslims are the largest Islamic denominational demographic, though some Muslims in the area may be Quranists. Most Sunni mosques are members of the Islamic Society of North America. The Nation of Islam had a former mosque in Newark presided by Louis Farrakhan.

A little over 1.2% practiced an eastern religion including Sikhism, Hinduism, and Buddhism. There are at least 10 Hindu temples in Newark's surrounding area. The remainder of Newark was spiritual but not religious, agnostic, deistic, or atheist, though some Newarkers identified with neo-pagan religions including Wicca and other smaller new religious movements. There is one Wiccan group in the city. Devotees of Santa Muerte are also in the city. Followers of afrodiasporic religions live in the city and surrounding area, primarily practicing Haitian Vodou or Santeria.

Economy 

More than 100,000 people commute to Newark each workday, making it the state's largest employment center with many white-collar jobs in insurance, finance, import-export, healthcare, and government. As a major courthouse venue including federal, state, and county facilities, it is home to more than 1,000 law firms. The city also has a significant number of college students, with nearly 50,000 attending the city's universities and medical and law schools. Its airport, maritime port, rail facilities, and highway network make Newark the busiest transshipment hub on the U.S. East Coast in terms of volume.

Though Newark is not the industrial colossus of the past, the city does have a considerable amount of industry and light manufacturing. The southern portion of the Ironbound, also known as the Industrial Meadowlands, has seen many factories built since World War II, including a large Anheuser-Busch brewery that opened in 1951 and distributed 7.5 million barrels of beer in 2007. Grain comes into the facility by rail. The service industry is also growing rapidly, replacing those in the manufacturing industry, which was once Newark's primary economy. In addition, transportation has become a large business in Newark, accounting for more than 17,000 jobs in 2011.

Newark is the third-largest insurance center in the United States, behind New York City and Hartford, Connecticut. Prudential Financial, Mutual Benefit Life, Fireman's Insurance, and American Insurance Company all originated in the city, while Prudential still has its home office in Newark. Many other companies are headquartered in the city, including IDT Corporation, NJ Transit, Public Service Enterprise Group (PSEG), Manischewitz, Horizon Blue Cross and Blue Shield of New Jersey, and Edison Properties.

After the election of Cory Booker as mayor, millions of dollars of public-private partnership investment were made in Downtown development, but persistent underemployment continue to characterize many of the city's neighborhoods. Poverty remains a consistent problem in Newark. As of 2010, roughly one-third of the city's population was impoverished.

Portions of Newark are part of an Urban Enterprise Zone. The city was selected in 1983 as one of the initial group of 10 zones chosen to participate in the program. In addition to other benefits to encourage employment within the Zone, shoppers can take advantage of a reduced 3.3125% sales tax rate (half of the % rate charged statewide) at eligible merchants. Established in January 1986, the city's Urban Enterprise Zone status expires in December 2023.

The UEZ program in Newark and four other original UEZ cities had been allowed to lapse as of January 1, 2017, after Governor Chris Christie, who called the program an "abject failure", vetoed a compromise bill that would have extended the status for two years. In May 2018, Governor Phil Murphy signed a law that reinstated the program in these five cities and extended the expiration date in other zones.

Newark is one of nine cities in New Jersey designated as eligible for Urban Transit Hub Tax Credits by the state's Economic Development Authority. Developers who invest a minimum of $50 million within  of a train station are eligible for pro-rated tax credit.

Technology industry 
The technology industry in Newark has grown significantly after Audible, an online audiobook and podcast company, moved its headquarters to Newark in 2007. The company was later acquired by Amazon. Panasonic moved its North America headquarters to the city in 2013. Other technology-focus companies followed suit. In 2015, AeroFarms, a developer of an aeroponic technology for farming moved its headquarters from Finger Lakes to Newark. By 2016, it had built the world's largest vertical farm in a Newark warehouse. The company was recognized in 2019 by Fast Company as one of the world's most innovative companies in data science. Broadridge Financial Solutions, a public FinTech company, announced a relocation of 1,000 jobs to Newark in 2017. In 2021, WebMD, an online publisher, announced that it will relocate and create up to 700 new jobs in the city.

In 2018, Newark was selected as one of 20 finalists for the location of Amazon HQ2, a new headquarters of Amazon. The advantages of Newark included proximity to New York City, lower land costs, tech labor force and higher education institutions, a major airport, and fiber optic networks. The extensive fiber optic networks in Newark started in the 1990s when telecommunication companies installed fiber optic network to put Newark as a strategic location for data transfer between Manhattan and the rest of the country during the dot-com boom. At the same time, the city encouraged those companies to install more than they needed. A vacant department store was converted into a telecommunication center called 165 Halsey Street. It became one of the world's largest carrier hotels. As a result, after the dot-com bust, there were a surplus of dark fiber (unused fiber optic cables). Twenty years later, the city and other private companies began utilizing the dark fiber to create high performance networks within the city.

As a concentration of technology workforce increased and investments grew in the city, it created an ecosystem for technology startups. Newark Venture Partners, an early-stage venture capital and startup accelerator launched in 2017, invested $42 million in its first funding round in 97 portfolio companies. In 2021, its second funding round raised up to $85 million. VentureLink@NJIT, the state's largest startup incubator, is located in New Jersey Institute of Technology campus. It has partnerships with international organizations such as National Association of Software and Services Companies of India. In 2021, HAX Accelerator, an early stage accelerator focused on hard tech startups, announced that it will create its US headquarters in Newark and build out a facility for industrial engineering, chemical engineering and systems integrators to fund industrial, healthcare, and green tech startups.

Port Newark 

Port Newark is the part of Port Newark-Elizabeth Marine Terminal and the largest cargo facility in the Port of New York and New Jersey. On Newark Bay, it is run by the Port Authority of New York and New Jersey and serves as the principal container ship facility for goods entering and leaving the New York metropolitan area and the northeastern quadrant of North America. The Port moved over $100 billion in goods in 2003, making it the 15th busiest in the world at the time, but was the number one container port as recently as 1985. Plans are underway for billions of dollars of improvements–larger cranes, bigger railyard facilities, deeper channels, and expanded wharves.

Property taxes 
In 2018, the city had an average property tax bill of $6,481, the lowest in the county, compared to an average bill of $12,248 in Essex County and $8,767 statewide.

Arts and culture

Architecture and sculptures 

There are several notable Beaux-Arts buildings, such as the Veterans' Administration building, The Newark Museum of Art, the Newark Public Library, and the Cass Gilbert-designed Essex County Veterans Courthouse. Notable Art Deco buildings include several 1930s era skyscrapers, such as the National Newark Building and Eleven 80, the restored Newark Penn Station, and Arts High School. Gothic architecture can be found at the Cathedral of the Sacred Heart by Branch Brook Park, which is one of the largest Gothic cathedrals in the United States. It is rumored to have as much stained glass as the Cathedral of Chartres. Newark also has four public works by Mount Rushmore sculptor Gutzon Borglum in Newark, which include Seated Lincoln (1911), Indian and the Puritan (1916), First Landing Party of the Founders of Newark (1916), and Wars of America (1926). Moorish Revival buildings include Newark Symphony Hall and the Prince Street Synagogue, one of the oldest synagogue buildings in New Jersey.

Performing arts 

The New Jersey Performing Arts Center, near Military Park, opened in 1997, is the home of the New Jersey Symphony Orchestra and the New Jersey State Opera, The center's programs of national and international music, dance, and theater make it the nation's sixth-largest performing arts center, attracting over 400,000 visitors each year.

Prior to the opening of the performing arts center, Newark Symphony Hall was home to the New Jersey Symphony, the New Jersey State Opera, and the Garden State Ballet, which still maintains an academy there. The 1925 neo-classical building, originally built by the Shriners, has three performance spaces, including the main concert hall named in honor of famous Newarker Sarah Vaughan, offering rhythm and blues, rap, hip-hop, and gospel music concerts, and is part of the modern-day Chitlin' Circuit.

The Newark Boys Chorus, founded in 1966, performs regularly in the city. The African Globe Theater Works presents new works seasonally. The biennial Geraldine R. Dodge Poetry Festival took place in Newark for the first time in 2010.

Venues at the universities in the city are also used to present professional and semi-professional theater, dance, and music. Since its opening in 2007, the Prudential Center has presented Diana Ross, Katy Perry, Lady Gaga, Britney Spears, The Eagles, Hannah Montana/Miley Cyrus, Bruce Springsteen, Spice Girls, Jonas Brothers, Metro Station, Metallica, Alicia Keys, Fleetwood Mac, Demi Lovato, David Archuleta, Aerosmith, Taylor Swift, Paul McCartney, and American Idol Live!, among others. The Rolling Stones broadcast their last show on their 50th anniversary tour live on pay-per-view from the arena on December 15, 2012. Bon Jovi performed a series of ten concerts to mark the venue's opening.

In the house music and garage house genres and scene, Newark is known as an innovator. Newark's Club Zanzibar, along with other gay and straight clubs in the 1970s and 1980s, was famous as both a gay and straight nightlife destination. Famed DJ Tony Humphries helped "spawn the sometimes raw but always soulful, gospel-infused subgenre" of house music known as the Newark sound. The club scene also gave rise to the ball culture scene in Newark hotels and nightclubs.

House music producer, DJ and writer Junior Sanchez started making house music in his teens growing up in the Ironbound district.

Brick City club, a dance-oriented electronic music genre, is native to the city.

Museums, libraries, and galleries 

The Newark Museum of Art, formerly known as the Newark Museum, is the largest museum in New Jersey. Its art collection is ranked 12 among art museums in North America with highlights on American and Tibetan art. The museum also contains science galleries, a planetarium, a gallery for children's exhibits, a fire museum, a sculpture garden and an 18th-century schoolhouse. Also part of the museum is the historic John Ballantine House, a restored Victorian mansion which is a National Historic Landmark. The museum co-sponsors the Newark Black Film Festival, which has premiered numerous films since its founding in 1974.

The city is also home to the New Jersey Historical Society, which has rotating exhibits on New Jersey and Newark. The Newark Public Library has eight locations. The library houses more than a million volumes and has frequent exhibits on a variety of topics, many featuring items from its Fine Print and Special Collections. The library also hosts daily programs including ESL classes, yoga classes, arts and crafts, history talks, and more.

Since 1962, Newark has been home to the Institute of Jazz Studies, the world's foremost jazz archives and research libraries. Located in the John Cotton Dana Library at Rutgers-Newark, the Institute houses more than 200,000 jazz recordings in all commercially available formats, more than 6,000 monograph titles, including discographies, biographies, history and criticism, published music, film and video; over 600 periodicals and serials, dating back to the early 20th century; and one of the country's most comprehensive jazz oral history collections, featuring more than 150 jazz oral histories, most with typed transcripts.

On December 9, 2007, the Jewish Museum of New Jersey at 145 Broadway in the Broadway neighborhood, held its grand opening. The museum is dedicated to the cultural heritage of New Jersey's Jewish people. The museum is housed at Ahavas Sholom, the last continually operating synagogue in Newark. By the 1950s there were 50 synagogues in Newark serving a Jewish population of 70,000 to 80,000, once the sixth-largest Jewish community in the United States.

The Grammy Museum Experience is an interactive, experiential museum devoted to the history and winners of the Grammy Awards which opened at the Prudential Center on October 20, 2017.

Newark is also home to numerous art galleries including the Paul Robeson Galleries at Rutgers University–Newark, as well as Aljira, a Center for Contemporary Art, City Without Walls, Gallery Aferro and Sumei Arts Center.

Newark Murals 

Since 2009, the Newark Planning Office, in collaboration with local arts organizations, has sponsored Newark Murals, and seen the creation of dozens of outdoor murals about significant people, places, and events in the city.

The Portraits mural, a massive multi-artist painting the length of 25 football fields created in 2016, is the longest continuous mural on the East Coast, and the second longest in the country. Seventeen artists contributed sections to the mural, including Adrienne Wheeler, Akintola Hanif, David Oquendo, Don Rimx, El Decertor, GAIA, GERA, Kevin Darmanie, Khari Johnson-Ricks, Lunar New Year, Manuel Acevedo, Mata Ruda, Nanook, Nina Chanel Abney, Sonni, Tatyana Fazlalizadeh, WERC and Zeh Palito. "Portraits" begins roughly at the intersection of Poiner Street and McCarter Highway in the South Ironbound district and stretches northwards  along the century-old stone walls supporting the Northeast Corridor and PATH tracks facing Newark's McCarter Highway (New Jersey Route 21).

Festivals and parades 
Festivals and parades held annually or bi-annually include the Cherry Blossom Festival (April) in Branch Brook Park, the Portugal Day Festival (June) in the Ironbound section, the McDonald's Gospelfest (spring) at Prudential Center, the Lincoln Park Music Festival (July) at Lincoln Park, the Newark Black Film Festival (summer) and Paul Robeson Awards (biennial), the Geraldine R. Dodge Poetry Festival (October, biennial) at various venues and the citywide Open Doors (October), the Afro Beat Fest (July) at Military Park, and the James Moody Jazz Festival, named for James Moody, the jazz artist raised in Newark (week-long event in November). St. Lucy's Church, a historically Italian parish in what was Newark's Little Italy, features an annual October procession and festival for St. Gerard Majella.  Our Lady of Mt. Carmel in the Ironbound hosts its annual Italian Street Festival every July.

In 2023, the North to Shore festival was announced, which will feature music and other entertainment at events in Asbury Park, Atlantic City and Newark throughout the month of June.

Parks and recreation

Colonial commons 

Military Park in Downtown Newark, the town commons since 1869 and home to the Wars of America sculpture by Mt. Rushmore sculptor Gutzon Borglum and the casual restaurant, Burg. As of 2018, the park is privately operated. Managed by a nonprofit corporation, the Military Park Partnership, which is staffed by Dan Biederman and Biederman Redevelopment Ventures, credited with transforming Manhattan's Bryant Park. The Military Park Partnership manages the programs, events, operations, security, and horticulture of the park.
Lincoln Park in the Arts District, one of three original colonial-era commons in Newark. From the 1920s to the 1950s, Lincoln Park was at the southern end of Newark's jazz and nightlife strip known as "The Coast."
 Harriet Tubman Square, the northernmost of the three original colonial-era commons in Newark. Formerly known as Washington Park, the equestrian statue of George Washington by J. Massey Rhind was dedicated here in 1912. Philip Roth's narrator in Goodbye, Columbus visits the park, saying "Sitting there in the park, I felt a deep knowledge of Newark, an attachment so rooted that it could not help but branch out into affection."

Passaic River waterfront 

Riverfront Park, which stretches along the Passaic River, includes the "Orange Boardwalk" & paths with views of the water.
Riverbank Park in the Ironbound along the Passaic River.

Other parks 

 Branch Brook Park, home to Newark's annual Cherry Blossom Festival and the largest collection of cherry blossom trees in the United States. It also features a lake and a pond. It was designed by the Olmsted Brothers firm, who carried on the firm of landscape architect Frederick Law Olmsted. It is a county park run by the Essex County Park System.
Weequahic Park, also designed by Olmsted Brothers, located in the South Ward in the Dayton section, east of the formerly heavily Jewish Weequahic neighborhood. It features  Weequahic Lake, an anthropogenic lake formed out of a marsh. Author Philip Roth describes the park in his historical fantasy novel The Plot Against America (2004). Weequahic is a county park in Newark that is maintained by the Essex County Park System. The non-profit Weequahic Park Sports Authority helps maintain the park.
 Independence Park, in the Ironbound district. Our Lady of Mt. Carmel, the Ironbound's first Italian parish, faces the park. The church holds an annual July pageant and processional where a statue of the Virgin Mary is carried through the streets.
 Ivy Hill Park in Ivy Hill
 Jesse Allen Park, in the Central Ward. The  Jesse Allen Park is Newark's second-largest city-owned park. It is located near several schools and youth facilities, including a well-liked Boys & Girls Club of Newark facility. As of 2017, it offered new amenities including new sports fields, skateboarding, basketball, Fitness Zone exercise stations, a water play spray area, and climate-resilient garden features.
 The Greater Newark Conservancy maintains the Judith L. Shipley Urban Environmental Center, and the Prudential Outdoor Learning Center. It offers urban farming and gardening displays and instruction and also includes a small pond.
 Mulberry Commons is a park between Prudential Center and Penn Station near what was once the heart of Newark's Chinatown.
 Nat Turner Park. Dedicated in July 2009, Newark's largest city-owned park is located in the Central Ward. It is named for the famous 19th-century American slave rebellion leader, Nat Turner.
 Vailsburg Park, covering , is in the Vailsburg neighborhood.
 Veterans Memorial Park is a county park operated by the Essex County Park System.
 West Side Park is a  park in the West Side neighborhood.

Golf and other recreational facilities 
 Sharpe James/Kenneth A. Gibson (Ironbound) Recreation Center.
John F. Kennedy Recreation & Aquatic Center
Rotunda Recreation & Wellness Center 
Marquis "Bo" Porter Recreation & Aquatic Center 
Hayes Park West Recreation Center 
Bradley Court Housing Complex
 Weequahic Golf Course is an 18-hole public course. The facility was described in 2016 by the Golf Channel as a "hidden gem". Home to The First Tee Program of Essex County and golf pro Wiley Williams, who was one of the first African-American golfers to win a major New Jersey golf event and works to introduce city youth to the sport.
 Jesse Allen Skateboard Park.

Media 
Newark is within the metro New York media market.

Newspapers 

The state's leading newspaper, The Star-Ledger, owned by Advance Publications, is based in Newark. The newspaper sold its headquarters in July 2014, with the offices of the publisher, the editorial board, columnists, and magazine relocating to the Gateway Center. The Newark Targum is a weekly student newspaper published by the Targum Publishing Company for the student population of the Newark campus of Rutgers University.

Other news outlets 
TAP Into Newark is an online news site devoted to Newark
 Newark Patch is a daily online news source dedicated to local Newark news.
The Newarker is a quarterly journal about culture, history and society in Newark and surrounding areas.
The Newark Times is an online news media platform dedicated to Newark lifestyle, events, and culture.
 The Newark Metro covers metropolitan life from Newark to North Jersey to New York City and is a journalism project at Rutgers Newark.
RLS Media covers breaking news from Newark and surrounding municipalities.
 The City of Newark shares news and events via its official Twitter account.
The Pod, developed by Black Owned New Jersey, is a weekly podcast that helps small businesses build, grow & maintain their business.

Radio 

Pioneer radio station WOR was started by Bamberger Broadcasting Service in 1922 and broadcast from studios at its retailer's downtown department store. Today the building serves telecom, colocation, and computer support industries known as 165 Halsey Street.

Radio station WJZ (now WABC) made its first broadcast in 1921 from the Westinghouse plant near Broad Street Station. It moved to New York City in the 1920s. Radio station WNEW-AM (now WBBR) was founded in Newark in 1934 and later moved to New York City. WBGO, a National Public Radio affiliate with a format of standard and contemporary jazz, is at 54 Park Place in downtown Newark. WNSW AM-1430 (formerly WNJR) and WQXR (which was formerly WHBI and later WCAA) 105.9 FM are also licensed to Newark.

Telephone 
In 1915, the Bell System under ownership of American Telephone and Telegraph Company (AT&T) tested newly developed panel switching technology in Newark when they cutover the telephone exchanges Mulberry and Waverly to semi-mechanical operation on January 16 and June 12, respectively. The Panel system was the Bell System solution to the big city problem, where an exchange had to serve large numbers of subscribers on both manual as well as automatically switched central offices, without negatively impacting established user convenience and reliability. As originally introduced in these exchanges, subscribers' telephones had no dials and customers continued to make calls by asking an operator to ring their called party, at which point the operator keyed the telephone number into the panel equipment, instead of making cord connections manually.

Most Panel installations across the country were replaced by modern systems during the 1970s and the last Panel switch was decommissioned in the BIgelow central office in Newark in 1983.

Television 

New Jersey's first television station, WATV Channel 13, signed-on May 15, 1948, from studios at the Mosque Theater known as the "Television Center Newark." The studios were home to WNTA-13 beginning in 1958 and WNJU-47 until 1989.

WNET, a flagship station of the Public Broadcasting Service now on channel 13, and Spanish-language WFUT-TV Channel 68, a UniMás owned-and-operated station, are licensed to Newark. Tempo Networks, producing for the pan-Caribbean television market, is based in the city. NwkTV has been the city's government access channel since 2009 and broadcast as Channel 78 on Optimum. The company has a high-tech call center in Newark, employing over 500 people. PBS network NJTV's main broadcasting studios (NJTV is also a sister station of the Newark-licensed WNET) are also in the Gateway Center Office Complex.

Film industry 

Numerous movies, television programs, and music videos have been shot in Newark, its period architecture and its streetscape seen as an ideal "urban setting". The Jersey Motion Picture and Television Commission is in the city. In 2011, the city created the Newark Office of Film and Television in order to promote the making of media productions. Some months earlier the Ironbound Film & Television Studios, the only "stay and shoot" facility in the metro area opened, its first production being Bar Karma. In 2012 the city hosted the seventh season of the reality show competition America's Got Talent.

There have been several film and TV productions depicting life in Newark. Life of Crime was originally produced in 1988 and was followed by a 1998 sequel. New Jersey Drive is a 1995 film about the city when it was considered the "car theft capital of the world". Street Fight is an Academy Award-nominated documentary film which covered the 2002 mayoral election between incumbent Sharpe James and challenger Cory Booker. In 2009, the Sundance Channel aired Brick City, a five-part television documentary about Newark, focusing on the community's attempt to become a better and safer place to live, against a history of nearly a half century of violence, poverty and official corruption. The second season premiered January 30, 2011. Revolution '67 is a documentary which examines the causes and events of the 1967 Newark riots. The HBO television series The Sopranos filmed many of its scenes in Newark, and is partially based on the life of Newark mobster Richard Boiardo. The Once and Future Newark (2006) is a documentary travelogue about places of cultural, social and historical significance by Rutgers History Professor Clement Price.
Also:
 The Many Saints of Newark, a Sopranos prequel by David Chase set in the late 1960s.
Rob Peace (currently filming). A film adaptation of the life story of Robert DeShawn Peace, murdered in 2011, is currently filming as of 2023. Rob Peace is written and directed by Chiwetel Ejiofor with a cast including Mary J. Blige and Michael Kelly.
 Heart of Stone (2009) on white flight in the heavily Jewish Weequahic section and Weequahic High School. Produced by Zach Braff.
Joker
The Newark International Film Festival is an annual event that hosts screenings, workshops and stunt exhibitions in Newark since 2015.

The film, Cat Person had been in production on 2021 and was listed as a filming location in Newark for scenes. There has not been a announced release date for the film as of January 2023. The movie "The Perfect Find" also had scenes filmed in Newark, as well as Orange and Jersey City with no released date announced. The movie, The Greatest Beer Run had scenes filmed in Newark and it was released on September 30, 2022 through Apple TV+.

The 2022 horror movie, Smile had several filming scenes in Newark, especially at the Murphy Varnish Lofts and Rutgers Medical School. The film is attributed as entirely filmed in New Jersey, especially locations of scenes: North Arlington, Hoboken, Elizabeth, Jersey City and Kearny.

The 2022 movie, Bros filmed additional scenes on Edison Place, Commerce Court, Raymond Blvd, and at the Newark Museum. Filming was done in 2021 and exterior shots of Newark Museum are shown as the lgbtq+ Museum in the film.

Lionsgate Newark 
In 2022, the city announced that a major new film and television production studio overlooking Weequahic Park and Weequahic Golf Course, to be called "Lionsgate Newark," would open in 2024 on the 15-acre former Seth Boyden housing projects site at 101 Center Terrace in the Dayton section of the city near Evergreen Cemetery. Lionsgate Newark will partner on public relations and community affairs with the New Jersey Performing Arts Center.

Sports 

Newark has hosted many teams, though much of the time without an MLB, NBA, NHL, or NFL team in the city proper. Currently, the city is home to just one, the NHL's New Jersey Devils. As the second-largest city in the New York metropolitan area, Newark is part of the regional professional sports and media markets.

Two venues in the northeastern New Jersey metro region are in Downtown Newark: Prudential Center, a multi-purpose indoor arena designed by HOK Sport that opened in October 2007 with a Bon Jovi concert and a hockey game. Known as "The Rock", the arena is the home of the National Hockey League's New Jersey Devils and the NCAA's Seton Hall Pirates men's basketball team, seating 18,711 for basketball and 16,514 for hockey. Riverfront Stadium was a 6,200-seat baseball park that was home to the baseball teams of the Rutgers-Newark Scarlet Raiders, who play in the New Jersey Athletic Conference as part of NCAA Division III, and the NJIT Highlanders, who play in the Atlantic Sun Conference as part of NCAA Division I. The stadium opened in July 1999 as the home of the Newark Bears, who played in the stadium until the team folded in 2014. The site of the stadium was sold in March 2016 to a developer who plans a mixed-use residential high rise project.

Red Bull Arena, home of the New York Red Bulls of Major League Soccer, opened in 2010 just across the Passaic River in Harrison.

The New Jersey Nets played two seasons (2010–2012) at the Prudential Center until moving to the Barclays Center. The New York Liberty of the Women's National Basketball Association (WNBA) also played there for three seasons (2011–2013) during renovations of Madison Square Garden. The center has hosted the 2012 Stanley Cup Finals, the 2011 NBA draft, and the 2013 NHL Entry Draft. EliteXC: Primetime, a mixed martial arts (MMA) event which took place on May 31, 2008, was the first MMA event aired in primetime on major American network television.

Newark was a host city and its airport a gateway for Super Bowl XLVIII which was played on February 2, 2014. The game took place at MetLife Stadium, home of the hosting teams New York Giants and New York Jets. Media Day, the first event leading up to the game, took place on January 28 at the Prudential Center. The original Vince Lombardi Trophy, produced by Tiffany & Co. in Newark in 1967 and borrowed from the Green Bay Packers, was being displayed at the Newark Museum from January 8 until March 30, 2014. Ultimate Fighting Championship's annual Super Bowl weekend mixed martial arts event, UFC 169: Cruz vs. Barao, took place on February 1 at the Prudential Center.

Government

Local 
The city is governed within the Faulkner Act, formally known as the Optional Municipal Charter Law, under the Mayor-Council Plan C form of local government, which became effective as of July 1, 1954, after the voters of the city of Newark passed a referendum held on November 3, 1953. The city is one of 79 municipalities (of the 564) statewide that use this form of government. The governing body is comprised of the Mayor and the City Council, who are elected concurrently on a non-partisan basis to four-year terms of office at the May municipal election. The mayor is directly elected by the residents of Newark. The city council is comprised of nine members, with one council member from each of the city's five wards and four council members who are elected on an at-large basis. The structure of the council was established after a 1953 referendum, in which more than 65% of voters approved a change from a five-member commission.

, the Mayor of Newark is Ras Baraka, who is serving a third term of office ending on June 30, 2026.  Members of Newark's Municipal Council are Council President LaMonica McIver (Central Ward), Luis A. Quintana (At-Large), Patrick O. Council (South Ward), C. Lawrence Crump (At-Large), Carlos M. Gonzalez (At-Large), Dupré L. Kelly (West Ward), Anibal Ramos Jr. (North Ward), Louise Scott-Rountree (At-Large) and Michael J. Silva (East Ward), all serving concurrent terms of office ending June 30, 2026.

After becoming acting mayor on October 31, 2013, Luis A. Quintana, born in Añasco, Puerto Rico, was sworn in as Newark's first Latino mayor on November 4, 2013, assuming the unexpired term of Cory Booker. He was selected unanimously at a council meeting to replace the previously elected Booker, who resigned and was sworn in on October 31, 2013, after winning the October 16 special election for U.S. senator to replace the seat held by Frank Lautenberg until his death. Quintana's term ended on June 30, 2014. The Newark mayoral election took place on May 13, 2014, and was won by Baraka, who was sworn in as Newark's 40th mayor on July 1, 2014.

Federal, state, and county 
Newark is split between the 8th and 10th Congressional Districts and is part of New Jersey's 28th and 29th state legislative districts. As part of the split that took effect in 2013, 123,763 residents in two non-contiguous sections in the city's north and northeast were placed in the 8th District and 153,377 in the southern and western portions of the city were placed in the 10th District.

Politics 

On the national level, Newark leans strongly toward the Democratic Party. As of March 23, 2011, out of a 2010 census population of 277,140 in Newark, there were 136,785 registered voters (66.3% of the 2010 population ages 18 and over of 206,253, vs. 77.7% in all of Essex County of the 589,051 ages 18 and up) of which 68,393 (50.0% vs. 45.9% countywide) were registered as Democrats, 3,548 (2.6% vs. 9.9% countywide) were registered as Republicans, 64,812 (47.4% vs. 44.1% countywide) were registered as Unaffiliated and there were 30 voters registered to other parties.

In the 2008 presidential election, Democrat Barack Obama received 90.8% of the vote (77,112 ballots cast), ahead of Republican John McCain who received 7.0% of the vote (5,957 votes), with 84,901 of the city's 140,946 registered voters participating, for a turnout of 60.2% of registered voters. In the 2012 presidential election, Democrat Barack Obama received 95.0% of the vote (78,352 cast), ahead of Republican Mitt Romney with 4.7% (3,852 votes), and other candidates with 0.4% (298 votes), among the 82,030 ballots cast by the city's 145,059 registered voters for a turnout of 56.5%. In the 2016 presidential election, Democrat Hillary Clinton received 90.7% of the vote (69,042 cast); Republican Donald Trump received 6.7% of the vote (5,094 cast); and other candidates received 1.5% of the vote (1,139 cast).

In the 2013 gubernatorial election, Democrat Barbara Buono received 80.8% of the vote (29,039 cast), ahead of Republican Chris Christie with 17.9% (6,443 votes), and other candidates with 1.2% (437 votes), among the 37,114 ballots cast by the city's 149,778 registered voters (1,195 ballots were spoiled), for a turnout of 24.8%. In the 2009 Gubernatorial Election, Democrat Jon Corzine received 90.2% of the vote (36,637 ballots cast), ahead of Republican Chris Christie who received 8.3% of the vote (3,355 votes), with 40,613 of the city's 134,195 registered voters (30.3%) participating.

Political corruption 
Newark has been marred with political corruption throughout the years. Five of the previous seven mayors of Newark have been indicted on criminal charges, including the three mayors before Cory Booker: Hugh Addonizio, Kenneth Gibson and Sharpe James. As reported by Newsweek: "... every mayor since 1962 (except one, Cory Booker) has been indicted for crimes committed while in office".

Addonizio was mayor of Newark from 1962 to 1970. A son of Italian immigrants, a tailor and World War II veteran, he ran on a reform platform, defeating the incumbent, Leo Carlin, whom, ironically, Addonizio characterized as corrupt and a part of the political machine of the era. In December 1969, Addonizio and nine present or former officials of the municipal administration in Newark were indicted by a Federal grand jury; five other persons were also indicted. In July 1970, the former mayor, and four other defendants, were found guilty by a Federal jury on 64 counts each, one of conspiracy and 63 of extortion. In September 1970, Addonizio was sentenced to ten years in federal prison and fined $25,000 by Federal Judge George H. Barlow for his role in a plot that involved the extortion of $1.5 million in kickbacks, a crime that the judge said "tore at the very heart of our civilized society and our form of representative government".

His successor was Kenneth Gibson, the city's first African American mayor, elected in 1970. He pleaded guilty to federal tax evasion in 2002 as part of a plea agreement on fraud and bribery charges. During his tenure as mayor in 1980, Gibson was tried and acquitted of giving out no-show jobs by an Essex County jury.

Sharpe James, who defeated Gibson in 1986 and declined to run for a sixth term in 2006, was indicted on 33 counts of conspiracy, mail fraud, and wire fraud by a federal grand jury sitting in Newark. The grand jury charged James with spending $58,000 on city-owned credit cards for personal gain and orchestrating a scheme to sell city-owned land at below-market prices to his companion, who immediately re-sold the land to developers and gained a profit of over $500,000. James pleaded not guilty on 25 counts at his initial court appearance on July 12, 2007. On April 17, 2008, James was found guilty for his role in the conspiring to rig land sales at nine city-owned properties for personal gain. The former mayor was sentenced to serve up to 27 months in prison, and was released on April 6, 2010, for good behavior.

Education

Colleges and universities 
Newark is the home of multiple institutions of higher education, including: a Berkeley College campus, the main campus of Essex County College, New Jersey Institute of Technology (NJIT), the Newark Campus of Rutgers Biomedical and Health Sciences (formerly University of Medicine and Dentistry of New Jersey), Rutgers University–Newark, Seton Hall University School of Law, and Pillar College. Kean University is located in adjacent Union, New Jersey. Most of Newark's academic institutions are in the city's University Heights district. The colleges and universities have worked together to help revitalize the area, which serves more than 60,000 students and faculty.

Public schools 

In the 2013–2017 American Community Survey, 13.6% of Newark residents ages 25 and over had never attended high school and 12.5% didn't graduate from high school, while 74.1% had graduated from high school, including the 14.4% who had earned a bachelor's degree or higher. The total school enrollment in Newark was 77,097 in the 2013–2017 ACS, with nursery and preschool enrollment of 7,432, elementary / high school (K–12) enrollment of 49,532 and total college / graduate school enrollment of 20,133.

The Newark Public Schools, a state-operated school district, is the largest school system in New Jersey. The district is one of 31 former Abbott districts statewide that were established pursuant to the decision by the New Jersey Supreme Court in Abbott v. Burke which are now referred to as "SDA Districts" based on the requirement for the state to cover all costs for school building and renovation projects in these districts under the supervision of the New Jersey Schools Development Authority. As of the 2020–21 school year, the district, comprised of 65 schools, had an enrollment of 40,423 students and 2,886.5 classroom teachers (on an FTE basis), for a student–teacher ratio of 14.0:1.

Science Park High School, which was the 69th-ranked public high school in New Jersey out of 322 schools statewide, in New Jersey Monthly magazine's September 2010 cover story on the state's "Top Public High Schools", after being ranked 50th in 2008 out of 316 schools. Technology High School has a GreatSchools rating of 9/10 and was ranked 165th in New Jersey Monthly's 2010 rankings. Newark high schools ranked in the bottom 10% of the New Jersey Monthly 2010 list include Central (274th), East Side (293rd), Newark Vocational (304th), Weequahic (310th), Barringer (311th), Malcolm X Shabazz (314th) and West Side (319th). Facebook co-founder Mark Zuckerberg donated a challenge grant of $100 million to the district in 2010, choosing Newark because he stated he believed in Mayor Cory Booker and Governor Chris Christie's abilities.

Charter schools in Newark include the Robert Treat Academy Charter School, a National Blue Ribbon School drawing students from all over Newark. It remains one of the top performing K–8 schools in New Jersey based on standardized test scores. University Heights Charter School is another charter school, serving children in grades K–5, recognized as a 2011 Epic Silver Gain School. Gray Charter School, like Robert Treat, also won a Blue Ribbon Award. Also, Newark Collegiate Academy (NCA) opened in August 2007 and serves 420 students in grades 9–12. It will ultimately serve over 570 students, mostly matriculating from other charter schools in the area.

Private schools 
The city hosts three high schools as part of the Roman Catholic Archdiocese of Newark: the coeducational Christ The King Prep, founded in 2007, is part of the Cristo Rey Community; Saint Benedict's Preparatory School is an all-boys Roman Catholic high school founded in 1868 and conducted by the Benedictine monks of Newark Abbey, whose campus has grown to encompass both sides of MLK Jr. Blvd. near Market Street and includes a dormitory for boarding students; and Saint Vincent Academy which is an all-girls Roman Catholic high school founded and sponsored by the Sisters of Charity of Saint Elizabeth and operated continuously since 1869.

Link Community School is a non-denominational coeducational day school that serves approximately 128 students in seventh and eighth grades. The Newark Boys Chorus School was founded in the 1960s. University Heights Charter School, which opened in 2006, taught 614 students in grades Pre-K–8 in 2014–2015.

Public safety

Emergency Medical Services 
University Hospital EMS (UH-EMS) operates the EMS system for the city. The department operates a fleet of six BLS units staffed with two EMTs 24/7, supplemented by four 12-hour "power" units (operated during peak demand time hours), five ALS units staffed with two paramedics (one of which is stationed at Newark International Airport and covers the airport and Port Newark-Elizabeth, and frequently responds into the City of Elizabeth), and a critical care unit staffed by a paramedic and an RN. With distinction they also staff the only hospital based heavy rescue truck in the country, known as University EMS Rescue 1. The EMS system is one of the busiest systems per unit in the nation. On average, a BLS unit may be sent to 20–25 dispatches in a 12-hour shift. They also provide the medical staffing for Northstar and Southstar, which are the two NJ State Police medevac helicopters, staffing one flight nurse and a flight medic around the clock. The EMS system in Newark handles upwards of 125,000 requests for service annually. The Ironbound Volunteer Ambulance Squad helps by handling BLS calls in the East Ward when members are on duty and has been in operation since 1969. The Vailsburg Volunteer Rescue Squad helps by handling BLS calls in the West Ward when members are on duty and has been in operation since 2019.

Fire department 

The city is protected by more than 700 full-time, paid firefighters of the Newark Fire Department (NFD). Founded in 1863, the NFD operates out of 16 firehouses throughout the city that are organized into 4 firefighting battalions (Battalions 1,3,4, and 5), with each Battalion Chief under the command of a deputy chief/tour commander. There is also a Safety Battalion Chief, Battalion 2, and a Special Operations Battalion Chief, Battalion 6, on duty 24/7. The NFD operates 16 engine companies, 8 ladder companies, 1 rescue company, an Urban Search and Rescue (USAR) Collapse Rescue Unit (Rescue 2), a USAR Collapse Rescue Shoring Unit, 2 fire boats, a scuba diving unit, a mobile medical ambulance bus, an air cascade unit, a foam unit, a quick attack response vehicle (QRV 1), a mobile command unit, 3 HazMat units, and numerous special, support, and reserve units. The NFD responds to approximately 45,000 emergency calls annually. In 2006, the NFD responded to 2,681 fire and hazardous condition calls. The department is a member of the Metro USAR Strike Team, which is composed of nine North Jersey fire departments.

Law enforcement 

The Newark Police Department is a city-operated law enforcement agency. As of January 2014, the force had 1,006 officers in its ranks. The Director of Public Safety is Brian A. O’Hara.

The Essex County Sheriff's Office, the New Jersey Transit Police Department (headquartered in Penn Plaza East) and the Port Authority of New York and New Jersey Police Department are also within their jurisdiction in the city, as are the New Jersey State Police. In April 2014, it was announced that the State Police would play a more prominent role in patrolling the streets of the city under the "TIDE-TAG" program. The Essex County College Police Department, New Jersey Institute of Technology Police Department and Rutgers University Police Department patrol their respective college campuses in the city. Conrail and Amtrak Police patrol their respective rail yards and property.

In 2018, the Newark Police began a de-escalation training program, which they credit for the achievement of no officer firing their weapon on duty in all of 2020.

Crime 
In 1996, Money magazine ranked Newark "The Most Dangerous City in the Nation." By 2007, the city recorded a total of 99 homicides for the year, representing a significant drop from the record of 161 murders set in 1981. The number of murders in 2008 dropped to 65, a decline of 30% from the previous year and the lowest in the city since 2002 when there were also 65 murders.

In 2010, Newark recorded 90 homicides. March 2010 was the first calendar month since 1966 in which the city did not record a homicide. Overall, there was a 6% increase in crime numbers over the previous year, including a rise in carjackings for the third straight year, with the 337 incidents raising concerns that the city was returning to its status as the "car theft capital of the world". Along with the increase in crime, the Newark Police Department increased its recovery of illegally owned guns in 2011 to 696, up from 278 in 2010. The Federal Bureau of Investigation recorded 94 homicides in 2011 and 95 in 2012. In 2012 CNNMoney ranked Newark as the 6th most dangerous city in the United States, based on numbers by FBI Crime in the United States 2011 report. The city had 10 murders in 10 days during the period ending September 6, 2013, a statistic largely attributed to the reduction of the police force. In 2013 Newark recorded 111 homicides, the first year ending in triple digits in seven years and the highest tally since 1990, accounting for 27% of all murders statewide. In 2014, the total number of homicides in Newark was 93, while Essex County as a whole had 117 murders. The Star-Ledger reported that there were 105 homicides in the city in 2015. The city had 72 homicides in 2017, a statistic described as a "historic low", and a sharp drop from the 96 murders recorded in the city in 2016. The Newark Police reported 69 homicides for 2018. As of August 13, 2019, after a period of 50 consecutive days without a homicide, a total of 34 had been recorded.

Water contamination
In Newark, lead concentrations in water accumulated for several years in the 2010s as a result of inaccurate testing and poor leadership. Newark's problem came from a negligence of officials who the city relied on to ensure clean water. The decrease in the quality of the water was due to several factors that were all somewhat interconnected. Lead service pipes that carry water were installed in Newark.

When this was recognized, the city had CDM Smith, a construction company that specializes in water systems, conduct a study to determine whether or not the water quality was safe enough to drink. The results revealed that the water was in fact safe to drink, but the results were severely skewed. This is because the city receives water from two water supplies: the Pequannock Treatment Plant and the Wanaque Treatment Plant. In some sampling rounds, only areas served by Pequannock were sampled, and in other rounds, only areas served by Wanaque were sampled, and each had different contaminant control systems in place that varied in their effectiveness. The Pequannock supply uses pH adjustments and silica for its corrosion control method, which worked for two decades before losing its effectiveness in 2016, while the Wanaque supply uses orthophosphate, a much more effective precaution.

In addition to this, the EPA requires that samples of drinking water be taken after no one has turned on a faucet for at least eight hours. Therefore, if high levels of lead do not show up in that initial sample, no further samples are required. This sample only represents the water closest to the faucet, that has not been stagnant in lead service lines, whereas the stagnant water in the lead piping may not be drawn until much later.

Top officials in Newark denied that their water system had a widespread lead problem, declaring on their website that the water was absolutely safe to drink. Even after municipal water tests revealed the severity of the problem Mayor Ras Baraka mailed a brochure to the cities residents that the water meets all federal standards. Although the city called an emergency declaration to allow them to purchase and distribute water filters for faucets but many of these were faulty. The city has received three noncompliance notices for exceeding lead levels since 2017 and continues to fight its lead problem.

Infrastructure

Transportation 

Newark is a hub of air, road, rail, and ship traffic, making it a significant gateway into the New York metropolitan area and the Mid-Atlantic U.S..

Newark Liberty International Airport is the second-busiest airport in the New York metro area and the 15th-busiest in the United States (in terms of passenger traffic). Newark Airport was the New York City area's first commercial airport, opened in 1928 on land reclaimed by the Port Authority.

Port Newark, on Newark Bay, is the 15th-busiest port in the world and the largest container port on the East Coast of the United States. In 2003, the port moved over $100 billion in goods.

Early modes of transport 

The Morris Canal, stretching  to Newark from Phillipsburg on the Delaware River, was completed in 1831 and allowed coal and other industrial and agricultural products from Pennsylvania to be transported cheaply and efficiently to the New York metropolitan area. The canal's completion led to increased settlement in Newark, vastly increasing the population for years to come. After the canal was decommissioned, its right of way was converted into the Newark City Subway, now known as the Newark Light Rail. Many of the subway stations still portray the canal in its original state, in the form of mosaic works.

As the city became increasingly congested further means of transportation were sought, eventually leading to horse-drawn trolleys. These, in turn, were replaced by electric trolleys that traveled down the main streets of downtown Newark, including Broad Street, and up Market Street near the courthouse. The trolley cars did not last long as the personal motor vehicle quickly gained popularity and slowly made the trolley system seem like a burden.

Roads and highways 

Newark is served by numerous highways including the New Jersey Turnpike (Interstate 95), Interstate 280, Interstate 78, the Garden State Parkway, U.S. Route 1/9, U.S. Route 22, and Route 21. Newark is connected to the Holland Tunnel and Lower Manhattan by the Pulaski Skyway, spanning both the Passaic and Hackensack Rivers, which was first constructed in 1938 and recently underwent a $900 million renovation project.

Local streets in Newark conform to a quasi-grid form, with major streets radiating outward (like spokes on a wheel) from the downtown area. Some major roads in the city are named after the towns to which they lead, including South Orange Avenue, Springfield Avenue, and Bloomfield Avenue, as well as Broadway, which had been renamed from Belleville Avenue.

In a city extensively served by mass transit, 44.2% of Newark residents did not have a car as of the 2000 Census, ranked second in the U.S. to New York City in the proportion of households without an automobile among cities with more than 250,000 people. According to the 2016 American Community Survey, the number of households without an automobile has decreased to 39.2%. The same year, the average Newark household owned .89 cars compared to a national average of 1.8 cars per household.

Public transportation 

Newark Penn Station, situated just east of downtown, is the city's major train station. It is served by the PATH's interurban Newark–World Trade Center line to Jersey City and Manhattan, three NJ Transit Rail Operations (NJT) commuter rail lines, and Amtrak intercity rail service. It was designed by McKim, Mead & White and completed in 1935. One mile north, the Newark Broad Street Station is served by two NJT commuter rail lines. The two train stations are linked by the Newark Light Rail system, which also provides services from Newark Penn Station to Newark's northern communities and into the neighboring towns of Belleville and Bloomfield. Built in the bed of the Morris Canal, the light rail cars run underground in Newark's downtown area. The city's third train station, Newark Liberty International Airport, connects the Northeast Corridor to the airport via AirTrain Newark.

Bus service in Newark is provided by NJ Transit, CoachUSA contract operators, and DeCamp in North Newark. Newark is served by NJ Transit bus routes 1, 5, 11, 13, 21, 25, 27, 28, 29, 34, 37, 39, 40, 41, 42, 43, 59, 62, 65, 66, 67, 70, 71, 72, 73, 74, 75, 76, 78, 79, 90, 92, 93, 94, 96, 99, 107, and 108. The 107 and 108 routes run to New York City. Bus route 308 is an express bus route to Six Flags Great Adventure from Newark Penn Station while 319 is an express service to Atlantic City.

The go bus 25 and go bus 28 are bus rapid transit lines through the city to Irvington, Bloomfield and Newark Liberty International Airport.

Modal characteristics 
According to the 2016 American Community Survey, 53.7% of working city of Newark residents commuted by driving alone, 9.3% carpooled, 27.3% used public transportation, and 6.5% walked. About 5% used all other forms of transportation, including taxicab, motorcycle, and bicycle. About 5.7% of working Newark residents worked at home.

Healthcare 
Newark is home to five hospitals. University Hospital, an independent institution that is a teaching hospital of Rutgers Biomedical and Health Sciences, has been the busiest Level I trauma center in the state. Newark Beth Israel Medical Center is the largest hospital in the city and is a part of Barnabas Health, the state's largest system of hospital and health care facilities. Beth Israel is also one of the oldest hospitals in the city, dating back to 1901. This 669-bed regional facility is also home to the Children's Hospital of New Jersey. Catholic Health East operates Saint Michael's Medical Center. Columbus Hospital LTACH is a longterm acute care hospital designed to focus on patients with serious and complex medical conditions that require intense specialized treatment for an extended period of recovery time. Hospitals which have been closed in recent years include the Saint James Hospital, Mount Carmel Guild Hospital and the United Hospitals Medical Center.

In 2016, annual testing of the water in Newark's public schools revealed elevated lead levels; more than 30 schools shut off their water fountains and turned to bottled water. In August 2019 the crisis over lead contamination in drinking water resurfaced because of new warnings from federal environmental officials. It is believed that the contamination was caused by aging lead pipes and changes in the water supply that makes the water more corrosive, causing lead from the pipes to be spread to the water inside. In August 2019, New Jersey began supplying water bottles to Newark residents in certain designated neighborhoods. On August 26, 2019, Newark officials announced a $120 million plan to expedite replacing the city's lead service lines in under three years. The 29,000 families affected by the contaminated water were provided with filters and bottled water. After testing in September, it was found that the filters were successful in 97% of homes tested, though bottled water would still be made available to those who request it. Long term-plans include the replacement of lead service lines from the water supply to homes.

International relations 
The Consulate-General of Ecuador in New Jersey is at 400 Market Street. The Consulate-General of Portugal in Newark is at the main floor of the Newark Legal Center at One Riverfront Plaza. The Consulate-General of Colombia is at 550 Broad Street. The Vice Consulate of Italy was at 1 Gateway Center, until it was closed in 2014 for economic reasons.

Pope John Paul II visited the city in 1995, at which time he elevated the city's cathedral to a basilica to become the Cathedral Basilica of the Sacred Heart. In 2011, the Dalai Lama was guest of honor at the Newark Peace Education Summit.

Twin towns—sister cities 
Newark has 15 sister cities listed by Sister Cities International in 2022:

  Aveiro, Portugal
  Banjul, Gambia
  Belo Horizonte, Brazil
  Douala, Cameroon
  Freeport, Bahamas
  Ganja, Azerbaijan
  Governador Valadares, Brazil
  Kumasi, Ghana
  Monrovia, Liberia
  Porto Alegre, Brazil
  Reserva, Brazil
  Rio de Janeiro, Brazil
  Seia, Portugal
  Umuaka, Nigeria
  Xuzhou, Jiangsu, China

Other sources list additional sister cities:

  Castlerea, Ireland
  Cuenca, Ecuador
  Kinshasa
   Loja Canton, Olmedo Canton, Loja, Alausi, Ecuador 
  Macará, Ecuador
  Machala Ecuador
  Ribeira, Spain 
  Quijos, Ecuador (a canton, not a municipality)

In January 2023 the Newark authorities were duped into entering into a brief twinning agreement with the fictitious nation of Kailaasa.

Notable people

See also 

 Halsey Street (Newark)
 List of mayors of Newark, New Jersey
 List of tallest buildings in Newark
 Municipal Council of Newark
 USS Newark, 5 ships

References

Footnotes

Further reading 
 
 
 
 Rabig, Julia. The Fixers: Devolution, Development, and Civil Society in Newark, 1960–1990. (U of Chicago Press, 2016). viii, 333 pp
 
 
 2005-Newark's land use plan including historical data

External links 

 
 Greater Newark Convention & Visitor Bureau

 
1666 establishments in New Jersey
1798 establishments in New Jersey
Cities in Essex County, New Jersey
County seats in New Jersey
Faulkner Act (mayor–council)
New Jersey Urban Enterprise Zones
Cities in the New York metropolitan area
Populated places established in 1666
Port cities and towns in New Jersey